Revisited is an album by Donavon Frankenreiter, and was released on June 22, 2010.

Track listing
"It Don't Matter" - 2:49 (Frankenreiter)
"Free" - 3:16 (Frankenreiter; Johnson)
"On My Mind" - 3:53 (Frankenreiter)
Whatcha Know" - 3:51 (Frankenreiter)
"Butterfly" - 3:15 (Frankenreiter)
"Bend In The Road" - 2:49 (Frankenreiter)
"Call Me Papa" - 3:59 (Frankenreiter)
"Heading Home" - 2:49 (Frankenreiter)
"So Far Away" - 3:56 (Frankenreiter)
Swing On Down" - 3:38 (Frankenreiter)

Personnel 
Ron Pendragon - Mastering Engineer, Mix Engineer
Jack Johnson - Composer
Donavon Frankenreiter - Vocals, Guitar, Producer
Matt Grundy - Bass, Vocals
Kirk Smart - Guitar
David Leach - Percussion

References

Donavon Frankenreiter albums
2010 albums